Ovobulbus is a genus of spiders in the family Oonopidae. It was first described in 2007 by Saaristo. , it contains 3 species found in Egypt and Israel.

References

Oonopidae
Araneomorphae genera
Spiders of Africa
Spiders of Asia